Stranahan High School, is located in Ft. Lauderdale, Florida was officially opened in 1953 as an elementary school. The school is a part of the Broward County Public Schools district. Originally for white students only, In 1963 Chester Seabury became the first African-American to graduate from a white high school in Florida when he graduated from Stranahan.

The school was built on land donated by Ivy Julia Cromartie Stranahan, and was named after her late husband Frank Stranahan. The school progressively added the junior high school grades a year at a time due to rapid population growth in the area. The school opened as a high school in 1957. The first principal of Stranahan was Kenneth Dale Haun. Kenneth Haun had been a Junior High Assistant Principal when he was picked to help design and then serve as principal of Stranahan. As the school added grades each year and then gradually dropped the middle school grades, Kenneth Haun continued as head of the school. He served as principal for nearly thirty years. The school's unique design of separate buildings spread out more like a college campus was a result of limited funds to build the school. Buildings were gradually added in phases to accommodate growth of the student population. The first hall building was converted to a 2-story building in the 1970s. During renovations of first hall in the early 90s, there was a large fire that consumed most of the building. The building was renovated and it now contains the administration on the first floor and the second floor has English and social studies classrooms. The second hall has computer labs and foreign language classrooms. Third hall has art classrooms and fourth hall has math. The magnet classrooms are mostly in the new science and medical magnet buildings. Previously some of the magnet classrooms were located in second and third hall.

The current principal is Michelle Padura. Stranahan High has an FCAT school grade of "B" for the 2013 academic year.

Overview 
Stranahan High School has two magnet programs dedicated to engineering and medical sciences. The magnet program's first graduating class was in 1997. It received a Gates Grant in 2005 and has begun a transition to small learning communities. The present community serving 9th grade students is CREST. Tenth through 12th grade students may choose among communities dedicated to business (downtown community), the arts (the studio community), technology and engineering (Sci-Tech community) or health related careers (the health pavilion community). In 2007 Stranahan was recognized by the College Board as one of three high schools in the nation to receive an "Inspiration Award" for outstanding achievement in minority student participation in Advanced Placement classes. It was also recognized by Newsweek magazine as one of the top 500 high schools in the country.  According to the Florida Department of Education classification, Stranahan High School is ranked an "C" school.

Attendance zone
The school serves sections of Fort Lauderdale and Davie.

Medical Magnet 

Students in the Medical Magnet program will be given specialized classes that are designed to inform them of general aspects of the medical field. Some of these classes include medical research, biotechnology, genetics, and forensics. Students are also encouraged in the Medical Magnet program to take Anatomy and Physiology versus physics, and also include special classes such as Health Science. Students in their 12th grade year are given the opportunity to travel to Broward General Hospital in order to observe different departments and also become interactive with doctors, nurses, or any staff.

Sports 
 Girls soccer
 Boys soccer
 Football
 Volleyball
 Swimming
 Cheer-leading
 Girls flag football
 Girls basketball
 Boys basketball
 Baseball
 Cross Country
 Wrestling
 Softball
 Track and Field
 Step Team

Extra curricular clubs 
 Business Professionals of America
 Ecology Club
 Key Club
 Marine Biology Club
 MCJROTC
 Mu Alpha Theta
 National Honor Society
 Gay Straight Alliance 
 Student Government Association (SGA)
 National Honor Society
 Women of Tomorrow
 Youth Crime Watch
 Health Occupations Students of America (HOSA)
 Best Buddies
 Future Florida Educators of America (FFEA)
 First Priority
 Poetry Club
 Guitar Club
 Colorful Spaces Club (BIPOC)

Demographics
As of the 2021-22 school year, the total student enrollment was 1,499. The ethnic makeup of the school was 33.4% White, 63.6% Black, 29.5% Hispanic, 0.7% Asian, 1.9% Multiracial, 0.3% Native American or Native Alaskan, and 0.1% Native Hawaiian or Pacific Islander.

Notable alumni 
 Tiffany Bolling, Television and Movie Actress class of 1965
 Rubin Carter, Defensive Tackle (1975–1986) Denver Broncos
 Reynaldo Hill, former NFL cornerback for the Tennessee Titans
 John Hope, Pitcher (1993–1996) Pittsburgh Pirates
 Undra Johnson, Running back, NFL, Atlanta Falcons, New Orleans Saints, Dallas Cowboys
 Andre King, Wide Receiver (2001–2004) Cleveland Browns
 Jacinta Monroe, (WNBA) Forward (2011-current) Tulsa Shock
 Jim Naugle, Former Mayor of Fort Lauderdale
 Sandra Peabody, talent agent, acting coach, former actress
 Demetrius Rhaney, American football offensive lineman, St. Louis Rams
 Carlton Rose, professional football player.
 Chester Seabury, first African-American to graduate from a white high school in Florida
 Jason Steele, politician
 Lee Williams, Defensive Tackle San Diego Chargers
 Diana Williams, Longtime ABC News Evening Anchor in New York City

References 

Broward County Public Schools
High schools in Fort Lauderdale, Florida
Educational institutions established in 1953
Public high schools in Florida
1953 establishments in Florida